Common End is a place noted on an Ordnance Survey map of Derbyshire, England. It is located eight miles south-east of Chesterfield, and just north of Astwith.

References

Hamlets in Derbyshire
Bolsover District